The huge moth family Noctuidae contains the following genera:

A B C D E F G H I J K L M N O P Q R S T U V W X Y Z

Obana
Obarza
Obdora
Obesypena
Obrima
Obroatis
Obtuscampa
Obucola
Ocalaria
Ochrocalama
Ochropleura
Ochrotrigona
Odice
Odontelia
Odontestra
Odontodes
Odontoretha
Oedebasis
Oederastria
Oederemia
Oediblemma
Oedibrya
Oedicodia
Oediconia
Oediplexia
Oenoptera
Ogdoconta
Oglasa
Oglasodes
Ogoas
Ogovia
Oidemastis
Oligarcha
Oligia
Oligonyx
Olivenebula
Olulis
Olulodes
Olybama
Olyssa
Ombrea
Omia
Ommatochila
Ommatophora
Ommatostola
Ommatostolidea
Omoptera
Omorphina
Omphalagria
Omphalestra
Omphaletis
Omphaloceps
Omphalophana
Omphaloscelis
Oncocnemis
Oncotibialis
Onevatha
Onychagrotis
Onychestra
Oortiana
Opacographa
Ophideres
Ophisma
Ophiuche
Ophiusa
Ophthalmis
Ophyx
Opigena
Oporophylla
Opotura
Opsigalea
Opsyra
Optocala
Oraesia
Orbifrons
Orbona
Orectis
Oria
Ornitopia
Oroba
Orodesma
Oromena
Oroplexia
Orosagrotis
Oroscopa
Orotermes
Orrea
Orrhodia
Orrhodiella
Orsa
Ortheaga
Orthia
Orthoclostera
Orthodes
Orthogonia
Orthogramma
Orthogrammica
Ortholeuca
Orthopha
Orthoruza
Orthosia
Orthozancla
Orthozona
Ortopla
Ortospana
Oruza
Oruzodes
Orygmophora
Osericana
Oslaria
Ossonoba
Ostacronycta
Ostha
Ostheldera
Osthelderichola
Osthopis
Otaces
Othreis
Othresypna
Outaya
Ovios
Owadaglaea
Oxaenanus
Oxicesta
Oxidercia
Oxira
Oxogona
Oxycilla
Oxycnemis
Oxygonitis
Oxylos
Oxyodes
Oxythaphora
Oxythres
Oxytrita
Oxytrypia
Ozana
Ozarba
Ozopteryx

References 

 Natural History Museum Lepidoptera genus database

 
Noctuid genera O